Arthrobacter stackebrandtii is a bacterium species from the genus Arthrobacter which has been isolated from poultry litter in the Netherlands.

References

Further reading

External links
Type strain of Arthrobacter stackebrandtii at BacDive -  the Bacterial Diversity Metadatabase

Bacteria described in 2005
Micrococcaceae